Shagya  is a village in the southern state of Karnataka, India. It is located in the Kollegal taluk of Chamarajanagar district.
Famous Places near shagya-Mekedatu and Hukunda

Demographics
 India census, Shagya had a population of 5802 with 3039 males and 2763 females.

See also
 Chamarajanagar
 Districts of Karnataka

References

External links
 http://Chamarajanagar.nic.in/

Villages in Chamarajanagar district